The 2016 Mississippi State Bulldogs football team represented Mississippi State University in the 2016 NCAA Division I FBS football season. The Bulldogs played their home games at Davis Wade Stadium in Starkville, Mississippi and competed in the Western Division of the Southeastern Conference (SEC). They were led by eighth-year head coach Dan Mullen. Despite having a 5–7 record, the first losing season since 2009, Mississippi State qualified for a bowl bid due to their high APR score. Mississippi State beat  the Miami RedHawks in the St. Petersburg Bowl to finish the season at 6–7.

Schedule
Mississippi State announced its 2016 football schedule on October 29, 2015. The 2016 schedule consists of six home and six away games in the regular season. The Bulldogs will host SEC foes Arkansas, Auburn, South Carolina, and Texas A&M, and will travel to Alabama, Kentucky, LSU, and Ole Miss.

The Bulldogs hosted the South Carolina Gamecocks for the first time since 2011. The team traveled to two independent schools, UMass for the first time and to BYU for the first time since 2000. Mississippi State hosted the other two non–conference games against Samford of the Southern Conference and South Alabama of the Sun Belt Conference.

Schedule Source:

Game summaries

South Alabama

Sources:

South Carolina

Sources:

Louisiana State

Sources:

UMass

Sources:

Auburn

Sources:

BYU

Sources:

Kentucky

Sources:

Samford

Sources:

Texas A&M

Sources:

Miami (OH)

Sources:

References

Mississippi State
Mississippi State Bulldogs football seasons
Gasparilla Bowl champion seasons
Mississippi State Bulldogs football